Dubois Historic District or DuBois Historic District may refer to:

Dubois Historic District (Blackfoot, Idaho), proposed or formerly listed on the National Register of Historic Places in Bingham County
Dubois Historic District (Dubois, Pennsylvania), listed on the National Register of Historic Places in Clearfield County